Akkaraipatti is a village panchayat in Vennandur block of Namakkal District in Tamil Nadu.

References

Vennandur block